Rikissa Birgersdotter, also known as Rixa, Richeza, Richilda and Regitze, ( 1237 – after 1288)  was Queen of Norway as the wife of the co-king Haakon Haakonson, and later Princess of Werle as wife of Henry I, Prince of Mecklenburg-Güstrow.

Biography
Rikissa Birgersdotter was born as one of the eldest children in the marriage of lord Birger Magnusson of Bjelbo (Birger Jarl) later riksjarl and regent of Sweden, and Princess Ingeborg Eriksdotter of Sweden, eldest sibling of King Eric XI of Sweden.

Rikissa's parentage is historically well attested, contrary to that of her supposed younger sisters. Rikissa received her name in honor of her maternal grandmother, the late Rikissa of Denmark, queen of Sweden – the Scandinavian custom was to give names of deceased grandmothers to daughters of a family, and a first-born daughter was usually christened as namesake of maternal grandmother, if she was no longer alive.

In 1250, her uncle, King Eric, died without heirs and her brother, the underaged Valdemar of Sweden became king through his mother, and her father Jarl Birger became regent of Sweden. Jarl Birger's policy included efforts to keep the peace between Scandinavia's three kingdoms and to strengthen his own already powerful family's influence. Thus his legitimate children were all considered de facto Swedish princes and princesses through their mother and through Birger's own royal ancestry.

In 1251, Rikissa was married to the heir of Norway, Haakon Haakonsson the Young  (1232–1257), titular king of Norway and co-ruler along his father king Haakon IV of Norway. Haakon and Rikissa had one son, Sverre Håkonsson who died young (1252–1261). Her husband King Haakon died in 1257 prior to his father's death in 1263, leaving his younger brother, Magnus VI of Norway (Magnus Lagabøte) as the heir-apparent to the kingdom.

In 1262, the Dowager Queen of Norway was married to Henry of Mecklenburg, Prince of Werle  (d. 1291). She had several children in her second marriage.

Issue
Heinrich II von Werle (died 1308)
Nikolaus von Werle (died 1298)
 Rikissa av Mecklenburg-Werle (died 1312) married Albert II, Duke of Brunswick-Göttingen

Speculations
Chronica principum Saxonie mentions Rikissa as daughter of King of Sweden (filia regis Suecie), which title has caused consternation among later researchers.
This has been explained by suggesting that:
  Rikissa was the granddaughter of king Eric X of Sweden
 the term in the chronicle just refers to "royal family of Sweden".
 during King Valdemar's minority, the all-powerful riksjarl and regent appeared to be a king to the writer of that chronicle
  upon Valdemar's accession to the royal throne, their mother Ingeborg, through whose lineage the crown was generally perceived to have come, was regarded as queen mother, despite never having been queen regnant or queen consort.

References

Other sources
 Cronica Principum Saxonie, MGH SS XXV, sida 476
 

	

13th-century Norwegian women
13th-century Swedish women
13th-century Norwegian people
13th-century Swedish people
Norwegian royal consorts
Richeza 1237
1230s births
Christians of the Second Swedish Crusade
Year of death missing
Rikissa
House of Bjelbo
House of Mecklenburg
Remarried royal consorts